"Hit the City" is the second and last single from Lanegan's breakthrough album Bubblegum. The song features the English rock musician PJ Harvey. "Hit the City" peaked at 76 on the British singles chart and was Lanegan's first single to chart.

Track listing
 "Hit the City"
 "Mud Punk Skag" (exclusive b-side)
 "Mirrored" (exclusive b-side)

Personnel
Mark Lanegan - vocals
PJ Harvey - vocals
Josh Homme - bass, drums
Keni Richards - drums
Jim Vincent - electronic drums
Mike Johnson - lead guitar
Ian Moore - background vocals
Bukka Allen - organ

2004 singles
2004 songs
Beggars Banquet Records singles
Songs written by Mark Lanegan